Calliteara kikuchii is a moth of the family Erebidae first described by Shōnen Matsumura in 1927. It is found in Taiwan.

References

Moths described in 1927
Lymantriinae
Moths of Taiwan
Taxa named by Shōnen Matsumura